Tinn Austbygd (also known as Austbygde or Austbygdi) is a village in the municipality of Tinn, Norway. It is located in the lower Tessungdal, by the northern end of Lake Tinn. Its population is 389.

References

Villages in Vestfold og Telemark
Tinn